Bangali Babu English Mem (2014) is an Indian romance comedy film directed by Ravi Kinnagi and released by Shree Venkatesh Films. It is a remake of Punjabi movie Jatt & Juliet.

Cast
Soham Chakraborty as Madhusudan Dutta
Mimi Chakraborty as Riya
Biswajit Chakraborty as Haranath
Laboni Sarkar as Parboti
Abir Chatterjee in a special appearance as Captain Bikram
Payel Sarkar in a cameo appearance as Air hostage Liza
Supriyo Dutta as Mr Dutta
Julia as Jenny

Plot
Madhusudan Dutta, a young man from Kolkata, wants to marry a Canadian girl to obtain Canadian citizenship while on the other side Riya a classy modern girl wants to go to Canada to study fashion designing. They both first meet at the passport office where Madhusudan asks Riya to fill his form because his hand was injured which he was pretending because of his lack of English. They both again meet at the airport and often disagree due to this. Riya looks for a nice accommodation where she finds a nice house and while getting money out of the ATM, she gets robbed by two thugs. Unfortunately, Riya has to look for cheaper place where she meets Madhusudan again and has to share that apartment with him. A day arrives when Jenny a Canadian Caucasian girl, arrives to the house where Riya and Madhusudan are living as she is the step-daughter of the house owner. Riya asks Madhusudan to propose Jenny and they both start making plans how to get Jenny for Madhusudan, but when Madhusudan learns that Jenny is going to Africa for social service, he ditches her and poor Jenny is left heartbroken. The owner of the house throws both of them out and they work at two different Horo Parboti restaurants that are run by wife and husband, who are not together now. Madhusudan and Riya soon learns that the Horo Parboti is going to be re-possessed by the bank because of six months unpaid property payments for the loan. Madhusudan and Riya work out the process of re-joining the husband and wife together so that the loan could be paid off. Slowly, Madhusudan and Riya start falling for each other but both of them don't want to admit it. Madhusudan realises that he loves Riya when Riya's fiancé, Bikram comes to take Riya with him to India for their marriage. Finally Madhusudan leaves for India with a hope to bring Riya back to his life but after watching Riya has been married he is left heartbroken. After a while, he meets Bikram at cinema hall where Bikram tells him that Riya is still single and Madhusudan runs to propose Riya and they live happily ever after.

Soundtrack

Reactions
Writing in The Times of India, Jaya Biswas had a generally positive but mixed reaction to the film, saying:
"The best part about the film is its dialogues. The way Madhu confidently converses in wrong English is hilarious. The humour appeals to all and comes across as a breath of fresh air amidst parts of boredom. The first half drags a lot."
More negative comments by the reviewer included such statements as "However, there are a few discrepancies in the plot", "No doubt the girl can act, but she too needs to hone her dancing skills a bit.", and "The first half drags a lot."

The review closed with the comment: "Bangali Babu English Mem is worth a dekko."

The Business Standard referred to the film as "...a typical Bengali rom-com with a new Tollywood pair."

References

Bengali-language Indian films
2010s Bengali-language films
Bengali remakes of Punjabi films
Films scored by Dabbu
Films scored by Rishi Chanda